Elizabeth A. Stuart is a professor of mental health, biostatistics, and health policy and management in the Johns Hopkins Bloomberg School of Public Health. Her research involves causal inference and missing data in the statistics of mental health. She was a co-author on a study showing that post-suicide-attempt counseling can significantly reduce the risk of future suicide.

Education and Career 
Stuart graduated from Smith College in 1997, with a mathematics major and chemistry minor. She completed her Ph.D. at Harvard University in 2004, in statistics, under the supervision of Donald Rubin. After working for two years as a researcher at Mathematica Policy Research, she joined the Johns Hopkins faculty in 2006.

Recognition 
In 2014 she was elected as a Fellow of the American Statistical Association "for outstanding contributions to research in the estimation of causal effects; for extensive efforts in the dissemination of statistical methods in education and mental health, including the development of widely used software; and for extensive service to the ASA and the profession." In 2020, she was elected Fellow of the American Association for the Advancement of Science, in the Section on Statistics.

References

External links
Home page

Year of birth missing (living people)
Living people
American statisticians
Women statisticians
Johns Hopkins Bloomberg School of Public Health faculty
Fellows of the American Statistical Association
Harvard University alumni
Smith College alumni